Přibyl (feminine Přibylová) is a Czech surname. It may refer to:
 Alois Pribyl, Czech geologist and palaeontologist
 Daniel Přibyl, Czech ice hockey player 
 Josef Přibyl, Czech wrestler
 Josef Přibyl, Czech chess master
 Karel Přibyl, Czech athlete
 Luboš Přibyl, Czech football player
 Miroslava Pribylova, Canadian volleyball player
 Roman Přibyl, Czech football player
 Vendula Přibylová, Czech ice hockey player
 Vilém Přibyl, Czech operatic tenor

Czech-language surnames